Louis Dumont (born January 30, 1973) is a Canadian former professional ice hockey player. He was the general manager for Louisiana IceGators of the Southern Professional Hockey League (SPHL). A career minor leaguer, Dumont is the ECHL's top all-time career scorer with 890 points.

On May 21, 2011, following a 17-year career as a professional hockey player, Dumont retired to take on the role of general manager for the Louisiana IceGators of the Southern Professional Hockey League (SPHL)

Awards
 WHL East Second All-Star Team – 1993

References

External links

1973 births
Living people
Augusta Lynx players
Ayr Scottish Eagles players
Canadian expatriate ice hockey players in Scotland
Canadian expatriate ice hockey players in the United States
Canadian ice hockey centres
Franco-Albertan people
Kamloops Blazers players
Louisiana IceGators (ECHL) players
Lowell Lock Monsters players
Manitoba Moose players
Memphis RiverKings players
Mississippi RiverKings (CHL) players
Mississippi Sea Wolves players
Pensacola Ice Pilots players
Regina Pats players
Ice hockey people from Calgary
Syracuse Crunch players
Tallahassee Tiger Sharks players
Utah Grizzlies (ECHL) players
Wheeling Thunderbirds players